CoolStreaming is a P2PTV (peer-to-peer television) technology that enables users to share television content with each other over the Internet. The technology behind CoolStreaming is similar to that of BitTorrent. The viewers upload content at the same time the programs are downloaded and viewed. CoolStreaming creates a local stream on localhost and that stream is then read by Windows Media Player, RealPlayer or other media players. The original coolstreaming code is developed with Python 2.3 on Windows.

Coolstreaming is a data-centric design of peer-to-peer streaming overlay. Notable features of the protocol include its intelligent scheduling algorithm that copes well with the bandwidth differences of uploading clients and thus minimises skipping during playback, and its swarm-style architecture that uses a directed graph based on gossip algorithms to broadcast content availability.

Coolstreaming is the first P2PTV system that attracted a remarkable number of clients (over one million, while most of the previous systems attracted less than one thousand clients).

As of June 10, 2005 the Coolstreaming service had stopped due to copyright issues.
However, there are several alternative services.

CoolStreaming is the base technology for Roxbeam Corp., which launched live IPTV programs jointly with Yahoo Japan in October 2006.

References

  Un solo sito per vedere tante reti tv - La Repubblica
  Tutti davanti alla Tv: e se va male, cè il web

External links 
 CoolStreaming/DONet: A Data-Driven Overlay Network for Efficient Live Media Streaming
 Coolstreaming: Design, Theory and Practice
 An Empirical Study of the Coolstreaming+ System 
 A Measurement of a large-scale Peer-to-Peer Live Video Streaming System
 Inside the New Coolstreaming: Principles, Measurements and Performance Implications

Streaming television
Peer-to-peer software